Ilkadım is a village in the Nusaybin District of Mardin Province in Turkey. The village is populated by Kurds of the Bubilan tribe and had a population of 112 in 2021.

References 

Villages in Nusaybin District
Kurdish settlements in Mardin Province